Slavica Đukić Dejanović (born 4 July 1951) is a Serbian politician, former Minister of Health in the Government of Serbia, acting Head of State of Serbia and President of the National Assembly of Serbia, and a long-time member of the Socialist Party of Serbia.

Dejanović is the second woman at the head of the National Assembly of Serbia, after Nataša Mićić, who was President of Parliament 2001–2004, and the first one in the independent Serbia. In that role she was also the Acting President of Serbia following the resignation of Boris Tadić in 2012 and was the first woman to hold the post of Head of State of Serbia since independence in 2006.

Biography
Dejanović was born on 4 July 1951 in Rača near Kragujevac, where she finished her elementary and secondary school. She graduated at the University of Belgrade School of Medicine, where she received her M.A. in 1983. and Ph.D. in 1986.

Professional career
Dejanović has worked at the University of Kragujevac Medical School since 1982, where she was first assistant, then docent and then as of 1992 she was an assistant professor. In 1996 Dejanović became a full professor. She also served as the Director of Clinical-Hospital Center in Kragujevac from 1995 to 2001. when she was removed from management functions but she remained to work as a doctor. Dejanović is the director of the Clinic for Psychiatry in Kragujevac and vice dean of Medical School and the vice president of the Association of Psychiatrists of Serbia. She was the president of the Commission for Drugs and a member of the Governing Board of Medical research within Section of science and technology.

Political career
Parallel with her doctor's career, Dejanović was building a political career as well. She became a member of the League of Communists of Yugoslavia when she was 18 years old. Dejanović was the chairman of Standing Action Conference of the League and a member of the Municipal Committee of the League for Kragujevac. Dejanović has been the member of the Socialist Party of Serbia since 12 September 1990. She was a member of the Main Board, the executive committee of the SPS and the chairwoman of Kragujevac Regional Committee of the SPS. She was elected for the vice-president of SPS for the first time in 1996 and remained in that position until April 1997. She was elected for the same function again on 12 May 2002 and reelected on 4 December 2006. 
In two terms she served as the MP in the National Assembly of Serbia and two terms as a Federal Deputy. In the interim Serbian government between October 2000 and January 2001 she was the minister for the care of the family.

On 25 June 2008, Dejanović was elected the President of the National Assembly of Serbia.

Following the decision of President Boris Tadić to resign and seek re-election in Serbian presidential elections on 6 May 2012, Slavica Đukić Dejanović became Acting President of Serbia on 5 April 2012.

References

External links 

Official Biography of The President of the National Assembly of Serbia
 

|-

|-

1951 births
Female heads of state
Living people
People from Rača
Presidents of Serbia
Presidents of the National Assembly (Serbia)
Government ministers of Serbia
Socialist Party of Serbia politicians
University of Belgrade Faculty of Medicine alumni
Women government ministers of Serbia
20th-century Serbian women politicians
20th-century Serbian politicians
21st-century Serbian women politicians
21st-century Serbian politicians
Women members of the National Assembly (Serbia)